"The Show Must Go On" is the 245th episode of the American television series ER. The episode aired on May 19, 2005 on NBC.

Plot synopsis
Dr. John Carter is back in the States to wrap up his affairs.  He purchases half a dozen pizzas for the ER staff, as well as some refreshments.  He also treats a patient who has injured her wrist.

Ray is dealing with whether he wants to go into his residency as a doctor. Dr. Archie Morris and Dr. Ray Barnett leave for another party.  This party is held on several floors in the back of an apartment building on the balconies at each level.  Morris promptly becomes intoxicated, and begins vomiting.  Barnett goes to help him.  Suddenly the porches collapse, one on top of each other.

Carter then leaves with Dr. Kovač for his "surprise" farewell party, where most of the attending doctors and his friends are waiting for him.  County General then stops accepting trauma patients after further problems with the sewer pipes in the hospital leaves them with only one operating room, coupled with the fact that the majority of the ER staff is at Carter's party.

Six people are killed in the porch collapse, and some are not hurt too badly.  Five more are critically injured in the accident.  Barnett surprises his friends with his handling of the situation.  The paramedics on the scene tell Barnett that they are going to take the critically injured to St. Rafe's Hospital because County is closed. County is the only Chicago hospital that has Level I Trauma Status in the show, making it the first choice for such situations.  Barnett uses the radio to call County and demands that Abby reopen the ER, otherwise the five critical patients would probably not make it to the hospital.  Dr. Lockhart initially refuses, as there are no attending physicians and only one OR, but when one of the critical patients dies, she relents.

Unable to reach Dr. Kovač by pager, they send a student over to fetch him.  The party immediately evaporates, as everyone runs back to the ER to help the victims of the porch collapse.  A surprised Carter returns from the restroom to empty tables.  They spend some time watching a slideshow of his time at County.  The presentation features past ER doctors, including Dr. Doug Ross (George Clooney), Dr. Mark Greene (Anthony Edwards), and Dr. Peter Benton (Eriq La Salle).  Eventually Dr. Susan Lewis brings Carter back to the ER.

Carter treats one last patient before leaving County General.  He is surprised to learn that he delivered the young girl with the broken wrist 11 years ago in Season 1.

Before he leaves he stops by to see Ray, Neela and Abby and shares the letter he wrote to himself as an intern under Dr. Greene, that had sat in his locker until this point. As Carter is leaving the hospital for the last time, Dr. Greene and Dr. Benton (his primary mentors) and Nurse Carol Hathaway are heard in voice-overs.  Outside, he finds a fatigued and partially sober Morris crouching outside.  Carter repeats the advice that was given to Dr. Greene by Dr. Morgenstern to the new chief resident: "You set the tone."

Inspirations
The porch collapse featured in this episode is based on the true story of the 2003 Chicago balcony collapse.

Also starring

Staff
 Scott Grimes as Dr. Archie Morris
 Leland Orser as Dr. Lucien Dubenko
 Sara Gilbert as Dr. Jane Figler
 Anthony Giangrande as Dr. Jeremy Munson
 Britain Spellings as Dr. Sackowitz
 Michael Spellman as Dr. Jim Babinski
 Yvette Freeman as Nurse Haleh Adams
 Lily Mariye as Nurse Lily Jarvik
 Laura Ceron as Nurse Chuny Marquez
 Deezer D as Nurse Malik McGrath
 Kyle Richards as Nurse Dori 
 Abraham Benrubi as Desk Clerk Jerry Markovic
 Monte Russell as Paramedic Dwight Zadro 
 Lyn A. Henderson as Paramedic Pamela Olbes 
 Emily Wagner as Paramedic Doris Pickman 
 Brian Lester as Paramedic Brian Dumar
 Jordan Calloway as Volunteer K.J.

This is the final episode with Noah Wyle (who plays Dr. John Carter) as a regular cast member, although he has several guest appearances in later episodes.

This is Scott Grimes' final episode before becoming a regular cast member in season 12, playing character Archie Morris.

Others
 Danny Glover as Charlie Pratt
 Sam Jones III as Chaz Pratt

External links
 Full Cast & Crew at the Internet Movie Database

ER (TV series) episodes
2005 American television episodes